The following lists events that happened during 1951 in the Union of Soviet Socialist Republics.

Incumbents
 General Secretary of the Communist Party of the Soviet Union – Joseph Stalin 
 Chairman of the Presidium of the Supreme Soviet of the Soviet Union – Nikolay Shvernik 
 Chairman of the Council of Ministers of the Soviet Union – Joseph Stalin

Events

Births
 17 September – Mārtiņš Brauns, Latvian composer (died 2021)
 21 October – Dmitry Gayev, Russian civil servant (died 2012)

Deaths
 31 December – Maxim Litvinov

See also
 1951 in fine arts of the Soviet Union
 List of Soviet films of 1951